This is a list of airlines currently operating in Egypt.

Airlines of Egypt

See also
 List of all airlines
 List of defunct airlines of Egypt
 List of airports in Egypt

Egypt
Airlines
Airlines
Egypt